Centennial Lake is a small lake in the Township of Wawa, Algoma District in Northeastern Ontario, Canada. It is in the Great Lakes Basin, and the primary outflow is an unnamed intermittent creek at the south. The creek flows to the Michipicoten River, which flows to Lake Superior.

See also
List of lakes in Ontario

References

Lakes of Algoma District